Aaron Eichhorn (born 22 September 1998) is a German footballer who plays as a midfielder for Fortuna Köln.

References

External links
 
 Aaron Eichhorn on FuPa.net

1998 births
Living people
German footballers
Association football midfielders
SC Fortuna Köln players
3. Liga players